The Sugar Dock is a structure at the edge of Chalan Kanoa, Saipan, extending out from the western shore of the island into the Philippine Sea in the western North Pacific Ocean. Aquatic plants, including sea grass, grow around the dock.
The dock was built by the South Seas Development Company to support the sugar industry during the Japanese period in the Northern Mariana Islands. American forces captured the dock during the Battle of Saipan and used it for logistics during and after the Asia-Pacific War.

School groups, community organizations, and government agencies conduct cleanups at the dock. Trees nearby were lost during Typhoon Soudelor in 2015 and Typhoon Yutu in 2018. The Micronesian Islands Nature Alliance (MINA) host an annual tree planting campaign near the area.

The structure is ruined and crumbling. It poses a safety hazard. The dock pier may be rebuilt by the CNMI government in the 2020s. The dock is a place for boats to tie up and a favorite swimming-hole of islanders. People have drowned near the dock.

References

Saipan
Northern Mariana Islands
Sugar industry in insular areas of the United States